Yengi Kand (also Romanized as Yengī Kand) is a village in Behi-e Feyzolah Beygi Rural District, in the Central District of Bukan County, West Azerbaijan Province, Iran. At the 2006 census, its population was 563, in 100 families.

References 

Populated places in Bukan County